Howard Lee "Chuck" Weimer (September 5, 1904 – April 27, 1990) was an American football player. He played college football for Wilmington College and in the National Football League (NFL) as a back for the Buffalo Bisons in 1929, the Brooklyn Dodgers in 1930, and the Cleveland Indians in 1931. He appeared in 27 NFL games, 16 as a starter.

References

1904 births
1990 deaths
Buffalo Bisons (NFL) players
Brooklyn Dodgers (NFL) players
Cleveland Indians (NFL) players
Players of American football from Ohio